"Wrecking Ball" is a song recorded by American singer Miley Cyrus for her fourth studio album, Bangerz (2013). It was released on August 25, 2013, by RCA Records as the album's second single. The song was written by Mozella, Stephan Moccio, Sacha Skarbek, with Dr. Luke and Cirkut, who also served as the producers, credited as co-writers along with David Kim. "Wrecking Ball" is a pop ballad which lyrically discusses the deterioration of a relationship.

"Wrecking Ball" debuted at number fifty on the Billboard Hot 100, and subsequently became Cyrus' first number-one song on the chart after the release of its controversial music video; it retained the peak position during the following week. Nine weeks later, the track returned to number one, and consequently had the largest gap between number-one sittings in Billboard Hot 100 history within a single chart run. As of January 2014, "Wrecking Ball" has sold three million copies in the United States. Outside of the United States, "Wrecking Ball" topped the charts in Canada, Hungary, Israel, Lebanon, Spain, and the United Kingdom, and peaked within the top ten of the charts throughout much of continental Europe and Oceania. It is Cyrus' only song to crack the Billboard Decade-End, doing so at number 99. The song also received a generally positive reception form music critics, who appreciated the song's vulnerability.

An accompanying music video for "Wrecking Ball" was released on September 9, 2013. It features close-up scenes of Cyrus tearfully singing, reminiscent of the clip for "Nothing Compares 2 U" by Sinéad O'Connor, interspersed with footage of a nude Cyrus swinging on a wrecking ball. Critics were divided in their opinions of the music video, feeling that it was more provocative than the clip for her previous single "We Can't Stop". "Wrecking Ball" previously held the Vevo record for the most views in the first 24 hours after its release with 19.3 million views. At the 2013 MTV Europe Music Awards, Cyrus took home the award for Best Video and the award for Video of the Year at the 2014 MTV Video Music Awards. Adding to the video's success, Cyrus won the award for World's Best Video at the 2014 World Music Awards in Monte Carlo. Cyrus performed "Wrecking Ball" during several live performances, including the iHeartRadio Music Festival, an episode of Saturday Night Live and the "TikTok Tailgate" before Super Bowl LV.

Background

Before directly stating that "Wrecking Ball" was originally written with Beyoncé in mind, songwriter Sacha Skarbek tweeted "Beyonce song now becoming a Miley Cyrus song?!! Good/bad? I don't know??!!!! "

The song, and the cover of its parent album Bangerz (2013), were unveiled on August 25, 2013, before Cyrus' performance at the 2013 MTV Video Music Awards. She released the cover artwork for "Wrecking Ball" on September 6, which shows Cyrus dressed in a sleeveless white shirt and underwear while swinging on a wrecking ball. The song was serviced to contemporary hit radio stations in the United States on September 17. It serves as the second single from Bangerz, following the lead single "We Can't Stop", which was released in June.

Composition

"Wrecking Ball" is a pop ballad;  According to the sheet music published at Musicnotes.com by Kobalt Music Publishing America, it is set in common time with a tempo of 60 beats per minute. The track is written in the key of D minor and follows the chord progression Dm–F–C–Gm, but the chorus is in F major. Cyrus' vocals span from the low note of F3 to the high note of B4. BMiriam Coleman of Rolling Stone noted that it begins with a minimalist keyboard instrumentation, which puts emphasis on Cyrus "anguished vocals", and also described it as a "heartbroken counterpoint" to "We Can't Stop". Cyrus said that "Wrecking Ball" was inspired by "OneRepublic, and the way Timbaland used to do those big ballads."

Critical reception
"Wrecking Ball" received mostly positive reviews from music critics. Writing for The A.V. Club, Marah Eakin provided a favorable review, calling it a "solid ballad" and describing it as "a modern day 'My Heart Will Go On' that discussed a deteriorated, shortlived young romance." Kitty Empire from The Observer opined that "the heartbreak section of Bangerz mostly repays your attention" and mentioned "Wrecking Ball" to be a part of it. Although he found the song "predictable," Evan Sawdey of PopMatters gave it an overall positive review and complimented its production and the build up to its chorus, calling it "the kind of broad mainstream song that shows how you how to properly build up to a chorus before hitting us over the head with it. Jon Dolan of Rolling Stone felt that it "[rides] the hunger and confusion that make great coming-of-age pop." Writing for AllMusic, Heather Phares considered the track to be a standout from Bangerz.

Writing for Digital Spy, Robert Copsey questioned Cyrus' decision to premiere a ballad in the midst of controversies regarding her "salacious exploits", but enjoyed the song itself and opined that it "proves that there's method behind the madness." In a more mixed review, Joseph Atilano from the Philippine Daily Inquirer appreciated the lyrics for seeming heartfelt, but felt that its production was "comparatively weaker" by comparison to her earlier projects. Mikael Wood of the Los Angeles Times felt that the track proved that Cyrus "isn't just a twerk-bot programmed to titillate", but suggested that her "singing throbs with what feels like an embarrassment of emotion" and found it peculiar that the song discussed the singer's relationship with Hemsworth when her public behavior seemingly suggested that she "couldn't care less about" it.

After a month of voting, on March 31, 2014, Billboard declared the song to be the winner of the 2014 Hot 100 March Madness and their favorite Top 5 single from the past year. It defeated songs like "Holy Grail" by Jay-Z and Justin Timberlake, "Best Song Ever" by One Direction, "Applause" by Lady Gaga, "Timber" by Pitbull and Kesha and finally "Just Give Me a Reason" by Pink and Nate Ruess.

Commercial performance
Before officially being serviced as a single, "Wrecking Ball" made a "hot shot debut" at number 50 on the US Billboard Hot 100 for the week issued on September 7, 2013, with 90,000 downloads in two days. It reached number 14 the following week with 201,000 downloads. After its official premiere as the second single from Bangerz, the track peaked at number one in the United States in its fourth week, heavily assisted by online streaming credits from its recently released music video; this gave Cyrus her first number-one single in the country. It sold 477,000 copies that week, becoming the third-highest single sales week of 2013, behind the 582,000 units moved by "I Knew You Were Trouble" by Taylor Swift and the 557,000 units moved by "Roar" by Katy Perry. In December, "Wrecking Ball" returned to the peak position after being stuck at number two or three the previous nine weeks as Lorde's "Royals" topped the Hot 100, with assistance from a viral parody video and consequently became the largest gap between number-one sittings in Billboard history within a single chart run. The next week it tumbled to number 5 as Eminem's "The Monster" featuring Rihanna topped the chart. As of December 2014, "Wrecking Ball" has sold 3,640,000 copies in the United States. The track peaked at number one on the Canadian Hot 100, and was later certified quadruple-platinum in the country. It reached the peak position on the Mexico Ingles Airplay.

In the United Kingdom, "Wrecking Ball" and Bangerz both debuted at the top of the UK Singles Chart and UK Albums Chart respectively on October 13, 2013 – for the week ending date October 19, 2013 – making Cyrus the first artist of 2013 to achieve an Official Charts Company "chart double". It was later certified platinum by the British Phonographic Industry. Additionally, the song became Cyrus' second chart-topping song in Britain after "We Can't Stop" in August 2013.

In Belgium, "Wrecking Ball" peaked at numbers four and five on the Belgian Ultratop in the Flanders and Wallonia regions respectively, and was eventually awarded a gold certification.

In Germany, "Wrecking Ball" peaked at number six on the German Singles Chart, and was later certified platinum. It charted at number three on the Italian FIMI chart, and earned a double-platinum certification.

In Australia and New Zealand, "Wrecking Ball" peaked at number two on the ARIA Singles Chart and the New Zealand Singles Chart respectively. It was certified sixtuple-platinum in the former country, and was given a platinum certification in the latter.

Music video

Synopsis
An accompanying music video for "Wrecking Ball" was directed by Terry Richardson, and was premiered through Vevo on September 9, 2013. The clip features close-up footage of Cyrus emotionally singing to the camera against a white backdrop, having been inspired by the music video for "Nothing Compares 2 U" by Sinéad O'Connor. Interspersed throughout are scenes of Cyrus licking a sledgehammer and swinging on a wrecking ball. At first, she is shown dressed in a midriff-baring tank top, panties and Doc Martens boots; as the video progresses, she is then shown wearing only the boots.

Reception

The music video received generally mixed reviews from critics, who were divided in their opinions regarding Cyrus's increasingly provocative image. Writing for Billboard, Jason Lipshutz stated that the "nude Cyrus shown straddling a swinging wrecking ball" was the most surprising piece of the clip. The staff from Entertainment Weekly joked that viewers would be "scandalized/titillated/disappointed in Billy Ray Cyrus's parenting skills" after seeing his daughter nude and "fellating a sledgehammer". Writing for The Guardian, Michael Hann criticized Cyrus's attempts to distance herself from her innocent Hannah Montana image, a former television series in which Cyrus portrayed the primary character Miley Stewart, a middle school student who led a secret double life as pop star Hannah Montana. He disapproved of the manner in which she transitioned into a career beyond her childhood success, specifically panning her for "exploring the iconography of porn." As of January 2015, Billboard named the video as the fourth best music video of the 2010s (so far).

James Montgomery from MTV News noted that the controversy surrounding Cyrus's nudity in the video was "to be expected" given her recent controversies, and complimented Richardson "for toning down the salacious scenes (if only for an instant), and allowing the softer, more genuine sides to shine through." Mikael Wood of the Los Angeles Times opined that the music video tried to paint Cyrus in a more serious light with its scenes of her emotionally singing and crying.

Billboard editor Jason Lipshutz opined "Wrecking Ball" is Cyrus's "Cry Me a River", for their controversial music videos and the artists' music evolution. "A decade ago, Justin Timberlake was in "My music will shut everyone up" mode, too, as he railed against a teenybopper image". He concluded "Cyrus is breathtaking and talented, and, now that she has our attention with her own version of "Cry Me a River," can dial down the shock tactics and present her artistic vision in the form of a new full-length."

With 19.3 million views in the first twenty-four hours of its release, the music video held the record for having the most views in that time-frame across Vevo platforms. This record was held by One Direction's music video for "Best Song Ever", which amased 10.9 million views in July. The first-day viewing record was surpassed by the video for "Anaconda" by Nicki Minaj in August 2014, which received 19.6 million views upon its premiere. The video has received over 1.0 billion views on YouTube. A director's cut of the music video was released on September 24, which features only the close-up footage of Cyrus singing against the white backdrop. Vanessa White Wolf from MTV News noted that "the only time Richardson cuts away is at the very end, where, after a quick director's credit page, we see Terry and Miley laughing and mugging for the camera."

The 2014 Australian art prize the Bald Archy was awarded to Judy Nadin for Wrecking Balls Ashes to Ashes, parodying cricketer Mitchell Johnson as Cyrus.

In an interview in 2017, Cyrus stated that she is not "a big fan" of the music video herself. "'Wrecking Ball' -- I'll do it, but I don't love it... It's when you're so stoked about something and then you have to sing a song that bums you out. And I'll never live down when I licked a sledgehammer."

Live performances
On September 21, 2013, Cyrus performed "Wrecking Ball" for the first time during the iHeartRadio Music Festival in Las Vegas; she performed twice, first in the afternoon at Festival Village, and later in the evening at the MGM Grand Garden Arena. Despite generating media attention for a provocative wardrobe, the performance was considered to be "fairly tame considering the VMAs".  On October 5, Cyrus served as the host and musical guest during an episode of Saturday Night Live, which gained favorable reviews from music critics. The following Monday, Cyrus performed the track on Today as part of their Toyota Concert Series. She also performed the song during appearances on Late Night with Jimmy Fallon and The Ellen DeGeneres Show later that month.

In November, Cyrus traveled to Europe to sing "Wrecking Ball" at the 2013 MTV Europe Music Awards in Amsterdam on November 10, 2013; she garnered media attention for smoking a joint of marijuana on-stage while accepting the Best Video Award for the track. On November 17, 2013, she performed the song on The X Factor in the United Kingdom. After being criticized for delivering a lackluster vocal performance, Cyrus was placed under "vocal rest" by her doctors in preparation of the Bangerz Tour. During her trip, she also performed on Wetten, dass..? in Germany (November 9), BBC Radio 1's Live Lounge in London (November 12), and the 2013 Bambi Awards in Germany (November 14). On November 24, Cyrus performed "Wrecking Ball" at the 2013 American Music Awards; a digitally animated cat projected on the screen behind her lip-synced the lyrics alongside her. In December, she performed at Jingle Ball concerts in Los Angeles (KIIS-FM Jingle Ball), Saint Paul, Atlanta, New York City, Washington, D.C., Tampa and Sunrise. Cyrus also performed "Wrecking Ball" on Dick Clark's New Year's Rockin' Eve with Ryan Seacrest in Times Square on December 31.

An episode of MTV Unplugged starring Cyrus premiered through MTV on January 29, 2014; she performed an acoustic version of "Wrecking Ball", among several additional tracks from Bangerz. On May 27, 2014 Cyrus performed the song during the World Music Awards held in Monte Carlo, Monaco; where she also won four World Music Awards. She wore a gown with a scenic theme based on flowers during the performance. It received positive reviews for its understated simplicity and strong vocal delivery. Cyrus returned to perform the song during the musical festival on June 21, 2014, Summertime Ball at Wembley Stadium of London, in front of 80,000 people. Cyrus has performed the song during her ongoing Bangerz Tour. A critic from the Nashville Scene praised the performance, writing, "Wrecking Ball was sung by Miley and earnestly shouted in unison by the arena, some of the audience tearing up." Blake Hannon praised Cyrus' vocal delivery, writing, "The crowd kept going when things slowed down for Wrecking Ball. It was the highlight of the night, and not because of anything visual. The costumed characters vanished and the screen was black, with Cyrus belting out one of the best pop power ballads in recent memory with only a smattering of lights. It's a reminder that beneath it all, Cyrus has a voice — and a pretty big one, at that."

Cover versions and media usage
In September 2013, British singer-songwriter James Arthur covered "Wrecking Ball" on Radio Hamburg in Germany. Later that month, The Gregory Brothers released a country version, which Laura Vitto from Mashable felt "trades in Miley's pop-ballad sound for a twangier feel." American singer-songwriter Alonzo Holt released his own rendition in October, which featured vocals from Arthur; it peaked at number 97 on the UK Singles Chart and number 71 on the Irish Singles Chart. Upstate New York alternative metal band Cry To The Blind released a cover of "Wrecking Ball" on December 11, 2013. American group Haim covered "Wrecking Ball" during their performance on BBC Radio 1's Live Lounge, while the trio London Grammar sang it for the same session in December. Rumer Willis later sang the track during a performance which Chiderah Monde from Daily News felt "captured more of the emotion behind the song" than Cyrus' version. American singer Rebecca Black uploaded an acoustic version to her YouTube channel in November. Canadian singer Sarah Blackwood of Walk Off the Earth also released an acoustic version.

Danie Geimer, a contestant on the third season of The X Factor USA, performed the track during the first live show on October 29, while Dami Im from the fifth season of The X Factor Australia sang it in the semi-final round. Marley Rose (Melissa Benoist) covered the song and parodied elements of the music video for the Glee episode "The End of Twerk". The late Christina Grimmie sang the song during the Blind Auditions of sixth season of The Voice USA. Australian artist Kat Jade auditioned with a stripped-back/single-piano version in the third season of The Voice Australia after posting a popular acapella version of the song to her YouTube channel. "Weird Al" Yankovic covered the song as the first in his polka medley "NOW That's What I Call Polka!" for his 2014 album Mandatory Fun. Metal band August Burns Red covered the song for the compilation album Punk Goes Pop 6. Melisa Cantiveros impersonated Miley Cyrus in Your Face Sounds Familiar (Philippines season 1) and performed this song, which she won the season.

50 Cent told NME that the song was the one he would perform at karaoke: "Just a big pop song that no one would suspect, just to fuck with them. Make them go, What?" The song was featured in the films  The Night Before and Free Guy.

In 2019, Tiffany Young covered the song as part of her Magnetic Moon tour.

In 2021, the song was covered by Brandy in the ABC drama series Queens. The song was released digitally worldwide on October 25, 2021.

Credits and personnel
Credits adapted from the liner notes of Bangerz'' and Tidal.

Recording
Engineered at Conway Recording Studios (Hollywood, California); Luke's In the Boo (Malibu, California); Monster Island Studio (New York City, New York); Maison de Musique (Toronto, Canada); Harmony Studios (West Hollywood, California); Capitol Studios (Hollywood, California)
Mixed at MixStar Studios (Virginia Beach, Virginia)

Personnel

Charlie Bisberat – violin
Mike Caffery – engineering
David Richard Campbell – strings
Steve Churchyard – engineering (strings)
Cirkut – songwriter, producer, programming, instruments
Kevin Connolly – violin
Miley Cyrus – lead vocals
Dr. Luke – songwriter, producer, programming, instruments
Andrew Duckles – viola
Eric Eylands – assistant
Serban Ghenea – mixing
Clint Gibbs – engineering
John Hanes – engineering for mixing
Sven Heidinga – engineering
Suzie Katayama – contracting, cello
David Kim – songwriter
Songa Lee – violin
Darrin McCann – viola
Mozella – songwriter
Stephan Moccio – songwriter, piano
Grace Oh – violin
Joel Pargman – violin
Alyssa Park – violin
Sara Parkins – violin
Rachael Pindlen – assistant
Steve Richards – cello
Irene Richter – production coordinator
Sacha Skarbek – songwriter
Rudy Stein – cello
John Wittenberg – violin
Steven Wolf – drums

Charts

Weekly charts

Year-end charts

Decade-end charts

Certifications and sales

Release history

See also
List of Billboard Hot 100 number-one singles of 2013
List of Canadian Hot 100 number-one singles of 2013

References

External links
 "Wrecking Ball" (Director's Cut) on YouTube 

2010s ballads
2013 singles
2013 songs
Billboard Hot 100 number-one singles
Canadian Hot 100 number-one singles
Miley Cyrus songs
MTV Video of the Year Award
Music videos directed by Terry Richardson
Music video controversies
Number-one singles in Hungary
Number-one singles in Israel
Number-one singles in Lebanon
Number-one singles in Scotland
Number-one singles in Spain
UK Singles Chart number-one singles
Pop ballads
RCA Records singles
Rebecca Black songs
Song recordings produced by Cirkut (record producer)
Song recordings produced by Dr. Luke
Songs written by Dr. Luke
Songs written by Mozella
Songs written by Sacha Skarbek
Songs written by Stephan Moccio
Obscenity controversies in music